Dani Baijens (born 5 May 1998) is a Dutch handball player for HSV Hamburg and the Dutch national team. 

He represented the Netherlands at the 2020 European Men's Handball Championship and the 2022 European Men's Handball Championship where the team has finished 10th, their alltime best result. Baijens scored 35 goals in 7 games at EHF EURO 2022.

References

External links

Living people
1998 births
Dutch male handball players
Sportspeople from Rotterdam
Expatriate handball players
Dutch expatriate sportspeople in Germany
Handball-Bundesliga players
SG Flensburg-Handewitt players